Syngliocladium is a genus of anamorphic fungi within the Ophiocordycipitaceae family. Members are anamorph names of Ophiocordyceps.

References

External links

Ascomycota genera
Ophiocordycipitaceae